Klaus Heinroth (born 25 December 1944) is an East German sprint canoer who competed in the late 1960s. At the 1968 Summer Olympics in Mexico City, he was eliminated in the semifinals of K-2 1000 m event.

References
Sports-reference.com profile

1944 births
Canoeists at the 1968 Summer Olympics
German male canoeists
Living people
Olympic canoeists of East Germany
Place of birth missing (living people)